Moghaddam or Moghadam (: "first", "preceding"); is a Persian language surname which in both of its Latin transcriptions (Moghaddam and Moghadam) of the Perso-Arabic alphabet is also common among the Iranian diaspora. Notable people with the surname include:

Moghadam

 Salar Moghadam (born 1986), Iranian musician

Moghaddam

 Nasser Moghaddam (1921–1979), Iranian general
 Afshin Moghaddam (1945–1976), Iranian singer
 Bita Moghaddam, neuroscientist
 Gholamreza Mesbahi-Moghaddam (born 1951), Iranian conservative politician
 Valentine Moghaddam (born 1952), American-Iranian feminist scholar, sociologist, activist and author
 Hamid Moghaddam (born 1956), Iranian-born American business executive and philanthropist
 Hassan Tehrani Moghaddam (1959–2011), Iranian engineer and military officer 
 Esmail Ahmadi-Moghaddam (born 1961), Iranian retired military officer
 Reza Moghaddam (born 1962), British-Iranian economist
 Mandana Moghaddam (born 1962), Swedish-Iranian contemporary visual artist
 Mehdi Sojoudi Moghaddam (born 1962), Iranian writer
 Morteza Kermani Moghaddam (born 1965), Iranian former footballer
 Fathali M. Moghaddam, Iranian psychologist
 Mahmood Amiry-Moghaddam (born 1971), Norwegian-Iranian neuroscientist
 Masoud Fouladi Moghaddam (born 1985), Iranian record producer, artist and DJ
 Taghi Rastegar Moghaddam, Iranian diplomat and one of four Iranians abducted in Lebanon on 4 July 1982

See also
 Moqaddam (disambiguation)
Persian-language surnames